Pavlovka is a rural locality (a village) in Petrovsky Selsoviet, Ishimbaysky District, Bashkortostan, Russia. The population was 40 as of 2010. There are 2 streets.

Geography 
Pavlovka is located 41 km northeast of Ishimbay (the district's administrative centre) by road. Kuzyanovo is the nearest rural locality.

References 

Rural localities in Ishimbaysky District